WDEZ (101.9 FM) is a radio station broadcasting a country music format. Licensed to Wausau, Wisconsin, United States, the station serves the Wausau-Stevens Point area.   The station is currently owned by Midwest Communications. The station is also broadcast on HD radio.

Current on-air staff
 Bryan Scott
 Chandra Lynn
Charli
Bill Fox
 Jeff Heinz

History
Formerly WRIG-FM,  The station simulcasted the Top-40 format of its AM sister station, until 1973, when programming was split, and a Beautiful Music Format was adopted, along with the current calls (Meaning "Duke's E-Z", after owner Duke Wright).  In October 1980, the station switched to a syndicated Country Music format from TM programming with a live local morning show featuring broadcast veteran Al Sellers then dropping its automation for an expanded live and local staff by the late 1980s.

References

External links

DEZ
Midwest Communications radio stations